The women's 50 metre backstroke competition at the 2018 Mediterranean Games was held on 23 June 2018 at the Campclar Aquatic Center.

Records 
Prior to this competition, the existing world and Mediterranean Games records were as follows:

The following records were established during the competition:

Results

Heats 
The heats were held at 10:00.

Final 
The final was held at 17:56.

References 

Women's 50 metre backstroke
Medit